Miriam "Mim" Grey is an English singer-songwriter. Grey has worked with London-based DJs and producers such as Lee Cabrera (2005 single/EP, "I Watch You") and Kurtis Mantronik (2003 single/EP "How Did You Know"). Tom Jones described Grey as his "favourite singer".

In May 2010, Grey released her first solo album, Grey Matters. She has since performed with Paul McCartney and Tom Jones.

Background
Grey was born in Barnet, north London, England and left school at age 15. With much promise, and the loving support of her family, she moved in with musicians John and Paul Williams, who encouraged her to follow a career in music. Grey released 'How Did You Know' with Kurtis Mantronix, and maintained her jazz group The Vodka Martinis. After Paul Williams died of pancreatic cancer, Grey formed a partnership with lyricist Cori Josias. A few years later, she met drummer, and now husband, Steve Vintner, who encouraged her to release her music, leading to the release of two albums, 'Grey Matters' and 'Chasing Tigers'.

Discography
Studio albums

Singles

References

External links

Mim Grey Sunday Best - Official Video from YouTube

Year of birth missing (living people)
Living people
English women singer-songwriters
English rock singers
British country singers
English dance musicians
Women rock singers
Singers from London
People from the London Borough of Barnet
21st-century English women singers
21st-century English singers